49 Ceti is a single star in the equatorial constellation of Cetus. It is visible to the naked eye as a dim, white-hued star with an apparent visual magnitude of 5.607.

This is a young A-type main-sequence star with a stellar classification of A1V. It is about 40 million years old with a high rate of spin, showing a projected rotational velocity of 196 km/s. The star has double the mass of the Sun. It is radiating 19 times the Sun's luminosity from its photosphere at an effective temperature of 8,790 K.

49 Ceti displays a significant infrared excess, which is a characteristic of a debris disk orbiting the star. Unusually, the disk seems to be gas-rich, with evidence of carbon monoxide (CO) gas. This carbon monoxide gas may possibly be from comets orbiting the star within the disk, similar to the Kuiper Belt in the Solar System.

References

A-type main-sequence stars
Circumstellar disks
Cetus (constellation)
Durchmusterung objects
Ceti, 49
009672
007345
0451